Jefferson and Taylor station is a streetcar station in the Fisherman's Wharf district of San Francisco, California, serving the San Francisco Municipal Railway's E Embarcadero and F Market & Wharves heritage railway lines. It is located on Jefferson Street at Taylor Street. The station opened on March 4, 2000, with the streetcar's extension to Fisherman's Wharf.

The stop is served by the  bus route, which provides service along the F Market & Wharves and L Taraval lines during the late night hours when trains do not operate.

References

External links 
SFMTA: Jefferson St & Taylor St
SFBay Transit (unofficial): Jefferson St & Taylor St

Taylor
Fisherman's Wharf, San Francisco
Railway stations in the United States opened in 2000